The Ajuruxi River is a river in the state of Amapá, Brazil. It is a left tributary of the lower Amazon River.

The Ajuruxi River defines the northeastern boundary of the  Rio Cajari Extractive Reserve, created in 1990.

See also
List of rivers of Amapá

References

Rivers of Amapá